Nishino (written: 西野) is a Japanese surname. Notable people with the surname include:

 Akira Nishino (politician)
 Akira Nishino (footballer)
 Kana Nishino, singer
 Nanase Nishino, singer
, Japanese footballer
, Japanese swimmer
 Yuji Nishino, baseball player
 Yuki Nishino, figure skater

Japanese-language surnames